SKIL Power Tools is a brand of electric power tools and accessories located in Naperville, Illinois, United States. It is a subsidiary of Chervon, a company based in Nanjing, China.

The company now focuses more on the do-it-yourself consumer, but at one time made professional construction-grade power tools, which are now being sold under their subsidiary, SKILSAW.

SKIL can trace its heritage to the invention of the circular saw by Edmond Michel in 1924, which led to the development of the SKILSAW circular saw Model 77 in 1937. Now referred to as “the saw that built America,” the Model 77 set the industry standard for handheld worm-drive circular saws which remains in production almost unchanged today. In an example of a genericized trademark, portable circular saws are often still called Skilsaws or Skil saws.

Skil products include circular saws, cordless drill/drivers, cordless screw drivers, cordless tackers, cordless sealant guns, belt sanders, random orbital sanders, multi-sanders, angle grinders, hammers, drills, mixers, jig saws, lasers and measuring tools, reciprocating saws, routers, and planers.

History

In the early 1920s, Edmond Michel, a French immigrant in New Orleans with a penchant for tinkering and inventing, watched a group of farmers hack away at sugar cane with large machetes. After observing the painstaking labor the workers went through, Michel began experimenting with how to mechanize the Machete. In 1923, Michel created a motorized machete, which had a  saw-blade mounted on carved wooden frame and powered with a motor taken from a malted milk mixer – the first electric handsaw.

After reading about Michel’s new invention, Joseph Sullivan, a Minneapolis land developer, set out to find the New Orleans inventor. After deciding to go into business together, Michel and Sullivan moved to Chicago and opened the Michel Electric Handsaw Co. in 1924.

After forming the company, six production models were made at $1000 each. Michel went to the new Atlantic City's Million Dollar Boardwalk to demonstrate the new tools, where the first portable electric saw was purchased for $160 by the Piers’ developer.

In 1926, the Skil brand name was born after Michel left the company to pursue other ventures, and Sullivan changed the company name to Skilsaw, Inc.

Skilsaw Model 77 Invented

After surviving the Great Depression, Skil continued making improvements to its saw. In 1928, Skil released the Model E Skilsaw, the first generation saw with a worm drive. In 1937, Edward Sterba perfected the Model E and built the first Model 77 with a  blade, considered the "workhorse on building sites". Skil celebrated the 75th anniversary of the Model 77 in 2012.

World War II

During World War II, Skil developed the PS-12 circular saw for military applications by mounting an air-driven Thor motor on a  worm-driven saw for use in several types of construction. Manufactured in camouflage colors, with saw blade painted black and the body a greenish color, the saw worked just about everywhere, including underwater to cut piles or timbers. The Navy had Skil put this tool into a special camouflage box coated and sealed with plastic. When they were unable to get into a landing area, the unit would be dumped overboard and floated or dragged in for use on aircraft landing areas.

Post World War II

After the end of World War II, Skil began expanding into international markets by opening a distribution and service center in Toronto, CA, in 1946. After selling directly to customers for 25 years, since the company’s inception, Skil entered the wholesale business and began distributing its products through hardware distributors.

In the 1950s, the company changed its name to the Skil Corporation. Skilsaw remained the brand name used for the company's products. European sales followed a few years later, by which time Skil had entered the consumer market. By 1959 it had a full and successful range of DIY tools.

Skil's European factory was built in 1961 in the Dutch town of Breda, followed soon after by an electric motor plant at Eindhoven, Netherlands. After successfully entering the European market, by the end of 1961 Skil had opened additional offices in Switzerland, the Netherlands, France, Belgium, Denmark and Germany.

Skil in Australia - 1960s
Skil broke into the Australian market in the early 1960s, when they acquired the Australian company Sher Powertools, which was a good quality tool, and sold at a premium price intended to compete with the European brands of Wolf and Desoutter which were well established fine quality brands of tools at the time.

1970s onwards
In the 1970s onwards, Skil constructed a network of factories, service centers and sales offices all around the world, its name becoming synonymous with power tools. Skil still has its European head office in Breda. All manufacturing of power tools for the European market is outsourced, mainly in China. Pre-development, Logisitics, Sales, Marketing and Finance are among the activities of the Dutch head office.

1979 to present
Emerson Electric acquired Skil Corporation on March 23, 1979. Under new ownership, Skil continued to grow. In late 1979, Skil redesigned many of its tools to have heavy-duty plastic, double-insulated housings. In 1982, the company embarked on a program to become the most successful power tool company in America by investing heavily in new manufacturing and quality-control systems. In 1985, Skil's heavy duty and super duty tool lines were renamed "Skil/ Skilsaw Professional". By 1988, the company had achieved its goal. 

In 1991, the Emerson Electric Company and Robert Bosch GmbH entered into a joint venture by combining their power tool subsidiaries. In 1992, the new venture came to fruition as S-B Power Tool Co. In 1996, after four years of the partnership, Robert Bosch GmbH took over complete ownership of Skil.

On August 23, 2016, Chervon (HK) Ltd., a power tool manufacturer based in Nanjing, China, agreed to acquire the SKIL brand from the Bosch Power Tools division, which gave them control over the SKIL businesses in both North America and the European market.

See also 
 Skilsaw

References

External links 

 
 Skil tool store (Dutch)
 Skil Philippines Website

Power tool manufacturers
2016 mergers and acquisitions
Tool manufacturing companies of the United States